The Dublin whiskey fire took place on 18 June 1875 in the Liberties area of Dublin. It lasted a single night but killed 13 people, and resulted in €6 million worth of damage in whiskey alone (adjusted for inflation). None of the fatalities suffered during the fire were due to smoke inhalation, burns, or any other form of direct contact with the fire itself; all of them were attributed to alcohol poisoning from drinking the undiluted whiskey that had been stored in casks; this alcohol was much more potent than whiskey offered at retail in bottles.

Origin
The fire is believed to have started in Laurence Malone's bonded storehouse on the corner of Ardee Street, where 5,000 hogsheads of whiskey were being stored to a value of £54,000 (equivalent to £ in ). The exact cause of the fire is unknown, but it is known to have started between 4:35pm when the storehouse was checked, and 8:30pm when the alarm was raised. At 9:30pm the barrels within the storehouse began to explode with heat, sending a stream of whiskey flowing through the doors and windows of the burning building.

Spread
The stream of whiskey first stretched down Cork Street, turning onto Ardee Street and catching a house on Chamber Street, then continued farther to Mill Street where it quickly demolished a row of small houses.

Human reaction 
People living nearby were first alerted to the fire by the sounds of squealing pigs from nearby livestock pens that had caught fire, and this is said to have contributed to a surprisingly rapid evacuation that was later commended by members of the emergency services as well as the Lord Mayor of Dublin at the time, Peter Paul McSwiney. He is quoted as saying:

"The time given for escape in some places during the progress of the fire was so short, I was apprehensive that some people should be left in danger in the garrets and cellars of the district. But on inquiry I was happy to learn that no life was lost during the great conflagration."

During the evacuation many people gathered by the streams of whiskey, filling any vessel at hand with the substance. “Caps, porringers, and other vessels" were all gathered to lap up the burning liquid, resulting in 24 hospitalisations due to alcohol poisoning and 13 subsequent fatalities.

See also 

 List of non-water floods

References 

1875 fires in Europe
History of Dublin (city)
Fires in Ireland
Food processing disasters
1875 in Ireland